Institute of Biophysics may refer to:

 Max Planck Institute of Biophysics, Germany
 Institute of Biophysics, Chinese Academy of Sciences